The Ofcom Code on Sports and Other Listed & Designated Events is a series of regulations issued originally by the Independent Television Commission (ITC) then by Ofcom when the latter assumed most of the ITC's responsibilities in 2003, which is designed to protect the availability of coverage of major sporting occasions on free-to-air terrestrial television in the United Kingdom.

In 1991, the Home Secretary, Kenneth Baker, devised a list of events not permitted to be broadcast solely on pay television services. The practice was placed on a statutory footing by the Broadcasting Act 1996, which required the ITC to create a permanent list of such events, dubbed the "crown jewels of sport". In 1997, the initial list was drawn up, and was revised in 1999, where the code was divided into two categories, A and B. The code was further amended in 2000 to give the ITC responsibility over UK-based broadcasters wanting to transmit listed events in other countries.

Eligible broadcasters 
Listed events may only be televised by eligible broadcasters, carrying a signal on a PSB multiplex on Freeview that covers at least 95% of the population, and must be carried by cable, satellite, and streaming IPTV services. As of July 2019, the eligible broadcasters are the BBC (including BBC One, BBC Two, BBC Three, BBC Four, BBC News, BBC Parliament, CBBC and CBeebies), ITV (including ITV2, ITV3, and ITV4), and Channel 4 (including Film4 and More4). Channel 5 is currently ineligible to broadcast listed events, as Ofcom deems that its My5 streaming services serve an insufficient number of platforms.

Category A
Category A events are events which must have live coverage made available to free-to-air channels, although pay television networks may share live coverage. As of 2020, these events are:

Association football:
FIFA World Cup (all matches)
FIFA Women's World Cup (all matches)
UEFA European Championship (all matches)
FA Cup Final
 Scottish Cup Final (in Scotland only)
Horse racing:
Grand National
Epsom Derby
Rugby league football:
Challenge Cup final
Rugby union football:
World Cup final
Tennis:
Wimbledon Championships finals (both men's and women's)
Multi-sport events:
Olympic Games (both summer and winter)
Paralympic Games (both summer and winter)

Category B
Category B events can be shown on pay television, provided sufficient secondary coverage (highlights, delayed broadcast, etc.) is made to free-to-air broadcasters. As of 2020, the events covered by this category are:

Association football:
UEFA Nations League
UEFA European Championship Qualifiers
UEFA Women's Championship
UEFA European Under-21 Championship
UEFA Youth European Championships
FIFA World Cup qualification
England National Football Team Matches
England under-21 national football team matches
England women's national football team matches

Athletics:
IAAF World Championships
Cricket:
Test matches played in England
World Cup (the final, semi-finals, and any matches involving the Home Nations)
Golf:
The Open Championship
Ryder Cup
Rugby union football:
World Cup (excluding the final)
Six Nations Championship matches involving the Home Nations
Tennis:
Wimbledon Championships (excluding the finals)
Multi-sport events:
Commonwealth Games

Cricket

The England cricket team's home Test matches were originally a Category A event. However, the England and Wales Cricket Board negotiated for it to be transferred to Category B and subsequently, and controversially, sold exclusive live broadcast rights for the 2006–09 home cricket seasons to Sky Sports. During the 2019 Cricket World Cup, bowing to public pressure, Sky stated that it would sub-license the final to Channel 4 (who sub-licensed highlights rights) if England were to qualify. England would advance, and beat New Zealand to win the title, in one of the first top-flight cricket matches aired free-to-air since 2005. Following the tournament, renewed calls emerged for test matches and/or the Cricket World Cup to be added to Category A.

Proposed changes

2009 review
In 2008 (in the lead-up to digital switchover), Ofcom began an independent review, led by David Davies, into the contents and organisation of the listed events criteria. On 30 July 2009, the BBC proposed that the list be expanded and reorganised to include a new "A1" category above the existing category A (renamed A3), designating that the event must be aired live in their entirety on free-to-air channels (such as the FIFA World Cup, UEFA Euro, and the Olympics), and "A2" for events seen as only important to one Home Nation and that must be broadcast in their entirety on free-to-air channels within said nation (such as the FA Cup final in England and the Scottish Cup final in Scotland). List A3 (requiring FTA highlights) would add the Cricket World Cup final and ICC World Twenty20 final, British and Irish Lions tours, and FIFA Women's World Cup, UEFA Women's Championship and Women's Cricket World Cup matches involving Home Nations.

The Davies review panel recommended the abolition of Category B in its entirely, leaving a single slate of listed events that must be televised in their entirety on British FTA television unless otherwise noted, including the Summer Olympics, FIFA World Cup and UEFA European Championship, the FA Cup final (outside of Scotland), the Scottish Cup final (inside Scotland), the Rugby World Cup, the Grand National, and Wimbledon. It was also proposed that qualifying matches for Euro and the World Cup that involve Home Nations (within the participating nations), the Ashes home tests, and Wales matches at the Six Nations Championship (in Wales) be added to the list. The Epsom Derby, rugby league Challenge Cup final, and the Winter Olympics were removed under the proposal.

2019–2020 changes 
In July 2019, Secretary of State for Digital, Culture, Media and Sport (DCMS) Jeremy Wright announced a consultation on adding the FIFA Women's World Cup and Paralympic Games to Category A. The 2019 FIFA Women's World Cup was televised in its entirety by the BBC, with total viewership of 28.1 million across the entire tournament. In September 2019, Wright's successor Nicky Morgan stated that she had begun to seek input with rightsholders on adding more women's sporting events to category A, in order to place them on "equal footing" with their men's counterparts. She was also pursuing updates to the listed event rules to account for changes in viewer habits prompted by digital platforms.

The summer and winter Paralympics were added to Category A in January 2020; The Times reported a final decision on the FIFA Women's World Cup and UEFA European Women's Championship is to come in the future, but both events are likely to see inclusion. The government declined to add the Ashes, the UEFA Champions League Final, and the Open Championship to the list.

In March 2020, BBC director-general Tony Hall called for the Six Nations Championship to be promoted to Category A, amid reports that the competition was seeking to include a pay television component (or: otherwise sign exclusively with a pay television broadcaster) in its broadcast contract for 2022 onward. The Six Nations is currently divided between the BBC and ITV, airing FTA in its entirety. An associated proposal by the committee of DCMS was rejected.

Olympics and Warner Bros. Discovery
In 2015, in contrast to prior deals with national broadcasters, the International Olympic Committee licensed all Olympic television rights covering Europe as a region to US pay-per-view broadcaster Discovery. In order to fulfil the requirements of the 1996 Act, Discovery sub-licensed a proportion of the rights back to the BBC for free to air broadcast. However, starting from Tokyo 2020, this deal had the effect of substantially reducing the extent of free-to-air coverage as compared with previous Games (to a single broadcast TV channel and a single online stream), with the majority of live coverage carried on pay television via Discovery's Eurosport brand. This led to complaints in the media due to the reduced free live coverage, in particular missing performances by British athletes.

After Warner Media merged with Discovery, becoming Warner Bros. Discovery, the company along with the European Broadcasting Union, whom the BBC is a member of, made a joint-bid and officially acquired the rights for all Olympic Games from the 2026 Winter Olympics to the 2032 Summer Olympics. As part of the deal, it will continue to provide the same package of rights the BBC has offered in their past agreements.

See also
Broadcasting of sports events
Public service broadcasting in the United Kingdom

References

Sports television in the United Kingdom
Sports competitions in the United Kingdom